Pseudomogoplistes is a genus of crickets in the family Mogoplistidae, erected by AV Gorochov in 1984.  The recorded distribution of species is Europe and North Africa.

Species
The Orthoptera Species File lists the following:
Pseudomogoplistes byzantius Gorochov, 1995
Pseudomogoplistes madeirae Gorochov & Marshall, 2001
Pseudomogoplistes squamiger (Fischer, 1853)- type species (as Gryllus squamiger Fischer)
Pseudomogoplistes turcicus Gorochov, 1995
Pseudomogoplistes vicentae Gorochov, 1996

References

External links
 
 

Crickets
Orthoptera genera
Ensifera
Orthoptera of Europe